The Women's ski slopestyle competition at the FIS Freestyle Ski and Snowboarding World Championships 2021 was held on 13 March. A qualification was held on 11 March 2021.

Qualification
The qualification was started on 11 March at 9:45. The eight best skiers qualified for the final.

Final
The final was started on 13 March at 09:30.

References

Women's ski slopestyle